Francisco IV de Benavides y Dávila, (1 November 1640, Madrid – 1716),  Viceroy of Sicily, 1678–1687,  Viceroy of Naples, 1687–1696,   9th Count of Santisteban del Puerto since March 1666, was the second son of Diego de Benavides, 8th Count of Santisteban (1607–1666).

Biography  

His mother was Antonia Dávila y Corella, first wife out of three, totalling some 9 males/females, being 10th Countess of Cocentaina and  the daughter of : Spanish aristocrat Jerónimo Ruiz de Corella, between other things, General of the Artillery radicated in the Duchy of Milan, Italy while her mother, a "Manrique", came from a family holding several marquisates and counties in Spain.

The title of Count of Santisteban del Puerto was awarded by king Henry IV of Castile on 21 September 1473 to Diego Sánchez de Benavides while the Grandee of Spain, was awarded to this Francisco IV de Benavides y Dánila, 9th Count by king Charles II of Spain on 8 July 1696. Moreover,  on 20 August  1738 the 10th Count, Francisco IV son, Manuel de Benavides y Aragon, (1683–1748), the 14th child out of 18 males/females,  would be promoted to 1st Duke of Santisteban del Puerto, by king Philip V of Spain while being a Spanish Army Brigadier to reward his help in several battles and wars in Europe, including Italy and actions to "recuperate" the kingdoms of Sicily and Naples for Imperial Spain administration.

He married Francisca Josefa de Aragón y Sandoval, (Lucena, province of Córdoba, Spain, 23 August 1647 – 29 January 1697, aged 50) having some 18 males/females in their marriage. His wife, Francisca Josefa, was a daughter of Luis Ramón de Aragón- Folc de Cardona y Córdoba, 6th Duke of Segorbe, (1608–1670) and Mariana de Sandoval-Rojas y Enriquez de Cabrera, (1614–1651, aged 37), 3rd Duchess of Lerma, closely related to the then virtual Prime Minister of Spain under king Philip III of Spain, the promoter of the 12-year truce between Spain and the Protestant provinces of the Low Countries, united in the Dutch Republic, within the frame of the Eighty Years' War or Dutch-Spanish War.

Some references
http://www.fundacionmedinaceli.org/casaducal/fichaindividuo.aspx?id=302
http://www.fundacionmedinaceli.org/casaducal/fichaindividuo.aspx?id=303
http://www.grandesp.org.uk/historia/gzas/santisteban.htm

1640 births
1716 deaths
Nobility from Madrid
Viceroys of Naples
Viceroys of Sicily
Counts of Spain
17th-century Spanish people
18th-century Spanish people
Grandees of Spain